Ashes is the fourth full-length album by the Norwegian band Tristania. The album registers a change in the band's musical style, leaving out the choirs and initiating a heavier sound, with a focus on darker lyrics and the clean vocals of Vibeke Stene. This album is the only one Kjetil Ingebrethsen performed harsh vocals on.

Track listing
All music and lyrics by Tristania, except where noted.

The first Ashes edition only contained 7 songs.
Special Enhanced North American Edition includes the videoclip of "Equilibrium", both bonus tracks and an alternative cover with Vibeke on it.
Japanese Edition also includes both bonus tracks.
Kjartan Hermansen was Tristania's webmaster at that time.

Charts

Personnel

Tristania
Vibeke Stene – vocals
Østen Bergøy – clean vocals
Kjetil Ingebrethsen – harsh vocals, aad. guitar, acoustic guitar
Anders Høyvik Hidle – guitars, additional vocals
Rune Østerhus – bass
Einar Moen – synth, programming, additional vocals
Kenneth Olsson – drums

Session Members
Hans Josef Groh – Cello on "The Wretched", "Shadowman", and "Endogenisis" (Recorded in Fagerborg Studio, Norway)

Production
Produced and mixed By Tristania & Borge Finstad
Recorded and engineered By Borge Finstad & Drajevolitch
Mastered by Morten Lund

References

External links
"Ashes" at discogs

2005 albums
Tristania (band) albums
SPV/Steamhammer albums